Manettia herthae is a species of plant in the family Rubiaceae. It is endemic to Ecuador.

References

hert
Endemic flora of Ecuador
Data deficient plants
Taxonomy articles created by Polbot